The Clavis Patrum Graecorum is a series of volumes published by Brepols of Turnhout in Belgium.  The series aims to contain a list of all the Fathers of the Church who wrote in Greek from the 1st to the 8th centuries.  For each it lists all their works, whether genuine or not, extant or not.  Each work is assigned a number, which is widely used as a reference in scholarly literature.  The text is in Latin.

Volumes 
Maurice Geerard, Clavis patrum graecorum: qua optimae quaeque scriptorum patrum graecorum recensiones a primaevis saeculis usque ad octavum commode recluduntur, Turnhout: Brepols, 1974–2003:

 vol. 1: Patres antenicaeni, schedulis usi quibus rem paravit F. Winkelmann, 1983 (nos. 1000 to 1925)
 vol. 2: Ab Athanasio ad Chrysostomum, 1974 (nos. 2000 to 5197)
 vol. 3: A Cyrillo Alexandrino ad Iohannem Damascenum, 1979 (nos. 5200 to 8240)
 vol. 3 A: A Cyrillo Alexandrino ad Iohannem Damascenum : addenda volumini III, a Jacques Noret parata, 2003
 vol. 4: Concilia : catenae, 1980 (nos. starting at 9000)
 vol. 5: Indices, initia, concordantiae, cura et studio M. Geerard et F. Glorie, 1987
 (vol. 6): Supplementum cura et studio M. Geerard et J. Noret, 1998

External links 
 Clavis Clavium, which offers the full text of the CPG in open-access
 Corpus Christianorum
 Contents of volume 2
 Brepols Publishers

Church Fathers